Tristan Lamasine and Franko Škugor were the defending champions but only Lamasine chose to defend his title, partnering Enzo Couacaud. Lamasine lost in the final to Thiemo de Bakker and Robin Haase.

De Bakker and Haase won the title after defeating Couacaud and Lamasine 6–4, 6–4 in the final.

Seeds

Draw

References

External links
 Main draw

Verrazzano Open - Doubles